"Skokiaan" is a popular tune originally written by Zimbabwean musician August Musarurwa (d. 1968, usually identified as August Msarurgwa on record labels) in the Tsaba-tsaba big band-style that succeeded Marabi. Skokiaan (Chikokiyana in Shona) refers to an illegal self-made alcoholic beverage typically brewed over one day that may contain ingredients such as maize meal, water and yeast, to speed up the fermentation process. The tune has also been recorded as "Sikokiyana", "Skokiana", and "Skokian". 

Within a year of its 1954 release in South Africa, at least 19 cover versions of "Skokiaan" appeared. The version made in the then-Southern Rhodesia reached No 17 in the United States, while a cover version by Ralph Marterie climbed to No. 3. All versions combined propelled the tune to No. 2 on the Cash Box charts that year. Its popularity extended outside of music, with several urban areas in the United States taking its name. Artists who produced their own interpretations include The Four Lads, Louis Armstrong, Bill Haley, Herb Alpert, Brave Combo, Hugh Masekela and Kermit Ruffins. The Wiggles also covered this song on their Furry Tales album. The music itself illustrates the mutual influences between Africa and the wider world.

History

Rhodesia (Zimbabwe)

"Skokiaan" was originally composed and first recorded as a sax and trumpet instrumental by the African Dance Band of the Cold Storage Commission of Southern Rhodesia (now Zimbabwe) under leadership of August Musarurwa (possibly in 1947 – anthropologist David Coplan seems to be the sole source for this date).
 The band comprised two saxophones, two banjos, traps, and a bass. Several tunes played by the Cold Storage Band were recorded by ethnomusicologist Hugh Tracey in June 1951. On Tracey's recording, Musarurwa also apparently played for the Chaminuka Band. Musarurwa copyrighted "Skokiaan", probably in 1952.

Ethnomusicologist Thomas Turino describes "Skokiaan" as having "a four-bar I-IV-I-V progression in 4/4 meter...The main melodic strain (A) begins with a long held trill...played by the sax on the dominant pitch...followed by an undulating, descending melody.  The A strain is contrasted with sections of riffing that follow the harmonic progression fairly closely...before the main melody returns." Towards the end of the original recording a short trumpet solo "is overlapped by Musarurwa's sax". The melody throughout "is carried by the sax".

Skokiaan's significance is that it shows how Africa influenced American jazz in particular and popular music in general.  Musarurwa's 1947 and 1954 recordings illustrate how unique the indigenous forms of jazz were that emerged in Africa in response to global music trends.  While African jazz was influenced from abroad, it also contributed to global trends.

"Skokiaan" has been adapted to various musical stylings, from jazz to mento/reggae (Sugar Belly and the Canefields), and Rock and Roll.  The tune has been arranged for strings (South Africa's Soweto String Quartet) and steel drums (Trinidad and Tobago's Southern All Stars). A merengue version was recorded in the Dominican Republic by Antonio Morel y su Orquesta in the 1950s, with saxophone alto arrangement by Felix del Rosario. A number of reggae versions of the song also exist, and marimba covers are particularly popular.

"Skokiaan" has been recorded many times, initially as part of a wave of world music that swept across the globe in the 1950s, spurred on in Africa by Hugh Tracey and in the United States by Alan Lomax, to name two. "Skokiaan" gained popularity outside Africa at the same time as the indigenous South African export, "Mbube" ("Wimoweh").  The sheet music was eventually released in 17 European and African languages. In France in 1955 the orchestra of Alix Combelle recorded a cover of "Skokiaan" on the Philips label. Jacques Hélian also recorded a version. Performers recorded "Skokiaan" in Finland (Kipparikvartetti), Germany (Bert Kaempfert), and Sweden (Lily Berglund), among others. In the United Kingdom, vocal versions were recorded by South African singer Eve Boswell and Alma Cogan.

But it was in the United States that "Skokiaan" peaked on the charts, where it was recorded by musicians as varied as The Four Lads and Johnny Hodges. Hodges's version is notable not only because he recorded the tune with Erroll Garner but because his band at the time included John Coltrane in a minor role.

United States
In 1954 Gallotone Records released a version of "Skokiaan" by Musarurwa and the Bulawayo Sweet Rhythm Band. After 170,000 copies were sold in South Africa, the president of London Records, E R Lewis, forwarded "a couple of copies" to London's offices in New York.  Meanwhile, a pilot had brought the original version from South Africa to the USA, and given it to Bill Randle of the radio station WERE (1300 AM) in Cleveland.  Although the copy was cracked, Randle was so impressed by what he heard that he asked Walt McQuire of London's New York office to send him a new copy.  After Randle played the record four times, interest soared.  London Records shipped 6,000 copies to New York from Britain, followed in September 1954 by a further 20,000.

Bulawayo Sweet Rhythm' original version took off and reached No 17 on the Billboard Best Sellers in Stores chart. Whether London Records' was a new recording, or a re-release of the Cold Storage Band's old recording under a new name, is uncertain.  The band's original name was changed, no doubt for easier Western consumption, perhaps by the record company or by the band itself.

 In 1954 covers of "Skokiaan" appeared on United States charts alongside Bulawayo Sweet Rhythm Band's original. The hitmakers included Ralph Marterie, who reached No 3 on the Cash Box chart. Marterie's instrumental was featured on ABC Radio's The Martin Block Show as "the best new record of the week".  It was the first time an instrumental had been selected for the show. (A claim that charted versions by Ray Anthony (who supposedly reached No 18), by Cuban-Mexican Perez Prado (supposedly reached No 26), and by Louis Armstrong (a Dixieland version said to have reached No 29), can so far not be verified.)

On the Cash Box best-selling record charts, where all hit versions were combined, "Skokiaan" reached No 2 on 16 October 1954.

English lyrics were added in 1954 by American Tom Glazer for the Canadian group The Four Lads. Glazer is perhaps better known for his On Top of Spaghetti (1963). On 4 August 1954 the Four Lads recorded (with Columbia Records) the only vocal version of "Skokiaan" that reached the United States charts, peaking at No 7 in the Billboard Best Sellers in Stores chart.

In line with the spirit of the times, Glazer's lyrics contain what Time arts columnist Richard Corliss describes as jovial "ethnographic condescension:"
"Oh-far away in Africa / Happy, happy Africa / ...You sing a bingo bango bingo / In hokey pokey skokiaan." Ethnomusicologist Thomas Turino points out that Glazer's depiction of the jungle setting is far removed from the topography of Southern Africa. But its one-size fits all "tropical paradise" idea was typical of exotic treatments at the time for songs from Latin America, Asia, and Hawaii.

In music historian Colin Escott’s liner notes of Moments to Remember: The Very Best of the Four Lads (2000), group member/vocal arranger Bernie Toorish recalled the day the Four Lads’s version came to being.

 —Bernie Toorish

In August 1954, Louis Armstrong recorded "Skokiaan" in two parts with Sy Oliver's Orchestra in New York (Decca 29256).  Part 1 (the A side) is a purely instrumental version, while Part 2 (side B) has Armstrong singing the lyrics. (Despite authoritative claims that Armstrong recorded a version entitled "Happy Africa", this cannot so far be substantiated from his discography.) On his tour of Africa, Armstrong met Musarurwa in November 1960. Whether the two musicians jammed together, or whether Armstrong just gave Musarurwa a jacket, is unclear. In any case, the difference between the date that Armstrong recorded "Skokiaan" and the date of his meeting with Musarurwa appears to invalidate claims that Armstrong recorded "Skokiaan" after he came face to face with the Zimbabwean.

The Four Lads' version of "Skokiaan" became the theme song at Africa U.S.A. Park, a  theme park founded in 1953 at Boca Raton, Florida by John P. Pedersen. The song was played all day long in the parking lot as guests arrived and was sold in the gift shop. The park boasted the largest collection of camels in the United States.  After it closed, the site was converted to the Camino Gardens subdivision. Other urban areas in the United States apparently influenced by the name of the song are Franklin, Ohio, which boasts a Skokiaan Drive, and Skokie, Illinois, which has a Skokiana Terrace.

Bill Haley & His Comets recorded an instrumental version in 1959 that reached No 70 on the Billboard Hot 100 chart in 1960. With the exception of reissues of "Rock Around the Clock", this would be the band's final chart hit in America.

"Skokiaan"'s popularity tracked the transition to electronic music, with an instrumental version recorded by moog pioneers Hot Butter in 1973 on the album More Hot Butter (preserved as a novelty item replete with "jungle" sounds on the compilation album Incredibly Strange Music Vol. 2). It was not the first such treatment of "Skokiaan": Spike Jones and the City Slickers recorded a "Japanese Skokiaan" in 1954, sung with a Japanese accent with lyrics about going to Tokyo, written by band member Freddie Morgan, a banjo player and vocalist (RCA Victor 47-5920).

Ringo Starr's 1974 hit "No No Song" was influenced by, and is sometimes listed as a medley with, "Skokiaan".

But true to its origins, "Skokiaan" remained a favourite among brass instrumentalists. In 1978, Herb Alpert and Hugh Masekela recorded the song as a brass duet with a disco flavor for their collaborative album Herb Alpert / Hugh Masekela. The tune put "Alpert on the R&B chart for the first time in his career". One of the most recent brass recordings was by Kermit Ruffins on his 2002 album Big Easy.

The song is included as a full-length performance by Kermit Ruffins, Irvin Mayfield and Troy Andrews in the 2005 documentary film Make It Funky!, which presents a history of New Orleans music and its influence on rhythm and blues, rock and roll, funk and jazz.

Misconceptions
Despite its Southern Rhodesian origins, record companies frequently added "South African Song" in brackets to the song's title, as was the case with recordings by Louis Armstrong, the Four Lads, Bill Haley, and Bert Kaempfert. This may have been due to misunderstandings about the difference between what was then Southern Rhodesia and South Africa, two countries in the Southern Africa region. As described in the introduction, "Skokiaan" was composed by a Southern Rhodesian, who was recorded by a South African record company.  The lyrics were later added by an American, Tom Glazer. Misled by Glazer's lyrics, some take "Skokiaan" to mean "Happy happy", leading to "Happy Africa" as an alternative title for the music. Again, as stated earlier, the term actually refers to a type of illicitly brewed alcoholic beverage (i.e. "moonshine").

The composer. August Musarurwa, was an ex-policeman, and said that the tune was one played in an illegal shebeen when a police raid was imminent. At the time it was illegal for Africans in Zimbabwe to drink anything but the traditional, low-alcohol beer, and certainly not skokiaan, which was usually laced with methylated spirits - illicit distillation was almost unknown in central Africa at the time.

Why the tune was associated with "a Zulu drinking song", as it was in a 1954 Down Beat article, is unclear.  The Zulu is an ethnic grouping found in South Africa; composer August Musarurwa was a Shona from Southern Rhodesia (now Zimbabwe).  The term skokiaan does occur in both Zulu and Shona and in the Zulu-based lingua franca, Chilolo. These are part of the Bantu language grouping and so share similar roots.  An early identification of skokiaan as a Zulu word which circulated in Johannesburg's slums is found in a scholarly article by Ellen Hellman, dated 1934. Musarurwa himself did not call his tune "a Zulu drinking song". The scanty fragments of his life history do not reveal that he spent time in South Africa, either. In South Africa there is no popular association of "Skokiaan" with a Zulu song.  However Southern Rhodesian migrant labourers moved back and forth between their home country and the mines of South Africa, located mostly around Johannesburg, making it unlikely, but not impossible, that Musarurwa's tune got influenced by a putative Zulu song.  Such journeys, often by train, led to the emergence of the song Shosholoza.  While Shosholoza has become very popular among South Africans, who often sing it to encourage their sports teams, its origins, like that of "Skokiaan", are Southern Rhodesian.

Other usages of the name
 A six-member band called Skokiaan formed in Liverpool in 1995 to play South African township jazz; they also recorded a version of the song. The Liverpudlians are not the only band with a "Skokiaan"-related name.
 A South African township jazz band, led by Sazi Dlamini, lays claim to Skokiana.

Outside the music world, the name "Skokiaan" has been applied to various artifacts other than songs; the relation between these appellations and Musarurwa's music is unclear:
 a bronze sculpture by German artist Detlef Kraft is called Skokiaan
 a modified version of the Centurion tank was named Skokiaan
 the middle name of Zambian-born Australian rugby player George Gregan is Musarurwa.

Chart positions

Chronological list of all versions 

"Skokiaan" has been recorded by these artists, and others:

Versions whose release dates are not known

See also
 August Msarurgwa
 Marimba, given the popularity of arrangements of "Skokiaan" for this instrument
 Tom Glazer, added lyrics to the 1954 cover version

References

External links

Audio
 2007. 78s fRom HeLL: The Bulawayo Sweet Rhythms Band – In The Mood (1954). I'm learning to share. Tuesday, 10 April. Blog with extensive visual material on "Skokiaan", including newspaper clippings, record label, and full mp3 download.
 Full audio recording of 1954 version of "Skokiaan" by the Bulawayo Sweet Rhythms Band at Beat the Devil blog by Brain Nation, 2 May 2005.  (requires Flash).
 Recordings of Musarurwa (Msarurgwa) and other Zimbwabwean jazz artists between 1950 and 1952 by ethnomusicologist Hugh Tracey on CD .
 Audio versions of the song by the Four Lads, Perez Prado, Bill Haley, and Louis Armstrong and Hugh Masekela  (requires RealMedia, registration).
 MP3 sample of Kutsinhira Cultural Arts Center's 2002 Zimbabwean marimba arrangement of "Skokiaan" (Sikokiyana). Opens sound file directly. 
 Full versions of "Skokiaan" by Kermit Ruffins as well as St. Petersburg Ska-Jazz Review and Joe Goldmark.

Visual
 Sheet music of the song Skokiaan.
 Images and history of Africa U.S.A..
 Photograph of the Bulawayo Sweet Rhythms Band. (Archived by WebCite) 

Songs with music by August Msarurgwa
Songs with lyrics by Tom Glazer
1947 songs
Louis Armstrong songs
Bill Haley songs
The Four Lads songs